Swastik Sanket is a Bengali-language adventure thriller film directed by Sayantan Ghosal based on Narak Sanket, novel of Debarati Mukhopadhyay. The film was released on 21 January 2022 under the banner of Eskay Movies.

Plot
Rudrani is invited to London by her publisher to inaugurate the international edition of her book on cryptography. She meets an elusive man Shumaker, who requests her to decrypt puzzles left behind by her grandfather-clues that can lead to a cure for Cancer. While Rudrani, along with her engineer husband Priyam takes on the challenge, what she doesn't realise is that she getting sucked into a pool of dangerous international conspiracy.

In a race against time Rudrani & Priyam must uncover the clues to the antidote of dreaded virus that challenges the very existence of mankind.

Cast
 Nusrat Jahan as Rudrani
 Gaurav Chakrabarty as Priyam
 Saswata Chatterjee as Subhas Chandra Bose
 Shataf Figar as Dr. Shumaker
 Rudranil Ghosh as Subhas Chatterjee
 Selina Youngerman as Eva Brown
 Jamie Langlands as Felix
 Michael Lipman as Joachim Von Ribbentrop
 Mick Liversidge as Professor Rudolph
 Raj Sengupta as Jimmy
 Birendra Roy as Robironjon Sen
 Jamie Humphrey as Richard
 Daniel Taylor as Adolf Hitler

Soundtrack

References

External links
 

2022 thriller films
Bengali-language Indian films
Indian adventure thriller films
Films about terrorism in Europe
Films based on Indian novels
Films based on thriller novels
Films directed by Sayantan Ghosal
2022 films
Films about Nazis
Films about Subhas Chandra Bose